Ab Morgen is a German film directed by Raphael Wallner. It was released in 2011.

External links
 

2011 films
2010s German-language films
German drama short films
2011 short films
2011 drama films
2010s German films